Auguste Antoine Piccard (28 January 1884 – 24 March 1962) was a Swiss physicist, inventor and explorer known for his record-breaking hydrogen balloon flights, with which he studied the Earth's upper atmosphere. Piccard was also known for his invention of the first bathyscaphe, FNRS-2, with which he made a number of unmanned dives in 1948 to explore the ocean's depths.

Piccard's twin brother Jean Felix Piccard is also a notable figure in the annals of science and exploration, as are a number of their relatives, including Jacques Piccard, Bertrand Piccard, Jeannette Piccard and Don Piccard.

Biography
Piccard and his twin brother Jean Felix Piccard were born in Basel, Switzerland, on 28 January 1884.

Showing an intense interest in science as a child, he attended the Swiss Federal Institute of Technology (ETH) in Zürich and became a professor of physics in Brussels at the Free University of Brussels in 1922, the same year his son Jacques Piccard was born. He was a member of the Solvay Congress of 1922, 1924, 1927, 1930 and 1933.

In 1930, an interest in ballooning and a curiosity about the upper atmosphere led him to design a spherical, pressurized aluminum gondola that would allow ascent to a great altitude without requiring a pressure suit. Supported by the Belgian Fonds National de la Recherche Scientifique (FNRS), Piccard constructed his gondola.

An important motivation for his research in the upper atmosphere was measurements of cosmic radiation, which were supposed to give experimental evidence for the theories of Albert Einstein, whom Piccard knew from the Solvay conferences and who was a fellow alumnus of ETH.

During this flight, they became the first human beings to enter the stratosphere, and were able to gather substantial data on the upper atmosphere, as well as measure cosmic rays. Piccard and Kipfer are widely considered the first people to visually observe the curvature of the horizon from the stratosphere.

(FAI Record File Number 6590)

In the mid-1930s, Piccard's interests shifted when he realized that a modification of his high-altitude balloon cockpit would allow descent into the deep ocean. By 1937, he had designed the bathyscaphe, a small steel gondola built to withstand great external pressure. Construction began, but was interrupted by the outbreak of World War II. Above the heavy steel capsule, a large flotation tank was attached and filled with a low density liquid for buoyancy. Liquids are relatively incompressible and can provide buoyancy that does not change as the pressure increases. And so, the huge tank was filled with gasoline, not as a fuel, but as flotation. To make the now floating craft sink, tons of iron were attached to the float with a release mechanism to allow resurfacing. This craft was named FNRS-2 and made a number of unmanned dives in 1948 before being given to the French Navy in 1950. There, it was redesigned, and in 1954, it took a man safely down . 

Auguste Piccard died on 24 March 1962 of a heart attack at his home in Lausanne, Switzerland; he was 78 years old.

Piccard family 
 Jules Piccard (professor of chemistry)
 Auguste Piccard (physicist, aeronaut, balloonist, hydronaut)
 Jacques Piccard (hydronaut)
 Bertrand Piccard (aeronaut, balloonist)
 Jean Felix Piccard (organic chemist, aeronaut, and balloonist)
 Jeannette Piccard (wife of Jean Felix) (aeronaut and balloonist)
 Don Piccard (balloonist)

References in popular culture 

 Auguste Piccard was the inspiration for Professor Cuthbert Calculus  in The Adventures of Tintin by Belgian cartoonist Hergé. Piccard held a teaching appointment in Brussels where Hergé spotted his unmistakable figure in the street.
This connection was confirmed by Hergé in an interview with Numa Sadoul.
"Calculus is a reduced scale Piccard, as the real chap was very tall. He had an interminable neck that sprouted from a collar that was much too large... I made Calculus a mini-Piccard, otherwise I would have had to enlarge the frames of the cartoon strip."

 Gene Roddenberry named Captain Jean-Luc Picard in Star Trek after one or both of the twin brothers Auguste and Jean Felix Piccard, and derived Jean-Luc Picard from their names.
 Will Gregory's opera, Piccard in Space, premiered at the Queen Elizabeth Hall in London on 31 March 2011. The libretto, by Hattie Naylor, focuses on Auguste Piccard's first balloon ascent with his assistant Paul Kipfer, and on the theories of Albert Einstein and Isaac Newton, who both appear as characters in the drama.
 In 2016, the exploits of Piccard and his son Jacques were featured in a US television commercial for Hennessy cognac.

See also
List of firsts in aviation

References

External links

 Footage of Auguste Piccard and his 1932 balloon ascent
 Don Piccard - 50 Years of Ballooning Memories
The Piccard Gondola Exhibit
 

ETH Zurich alumni
Academic staff of ETH Zurich
Swiss balloonists
Swiss explorers
Swiss physicists
Swiss Protestants
Scientists from Basel-Stadt
1884 births
1962 deaths
Flight altitude record holders
Balloon flight record holders
Swiss aviation record holders
Swiss twins